The 2017–18 Mitropa Futsal Cup was the 8th edition of The Mitropa Futsal Cup, an annual international futsal competition, which took place on August 14, 2016 at the Sporthalle Hollgasse in Vienna. It did feature futsal teams from Austria, Hungary, The Czech Republic and Germany. 

Győri ETO Futsal Club were the defending champions.

Participating Teams

Standings

Fixtures and results

Stella Rossa Wien vs TV Wackersdorf

Győri ETO Futsal Club vs FC Tango Hodonin

TV Wackersdorf vs Győri ETO Futsal Club

Stella Rossa Wien vs FC Tango Hodonin

FC Tango Hodonin vs TV Wackersdorf

Stella Rossa Wien vs Győri ETO Futsal Club

Top goalscorers

References

External links
 Mitropa Futsal Cup
 Mitropa Futsal Cup 2016 on FutsalPlanet.com
 Stella Rossa Wien - Official Website
 TRIPLÁZOTT AZ ETO A MITROPA KUPÁN (Hungarian)
 Z Mitropa Cupu vezeme stříbro i cenné zkušenosti (Czech)
 Wackersdorf Futsal holt einen Punkt beim Mitropacup (German)

Futsal competitions in Europe
Top level futsal leagues in Europe
2009 establishments in Europe